Commando A. Baskaran (also known as A. Baskaran of AIADMK) is the Chairman of Tiruvallur town.

Baskaran was the AIADMK candidate for Tiruvallur constituency in the 2016 Tamil Nadu Legislative Assembly elections. He is currently the Thiruvallur district AIADMK vice secretary.

References

Living people
All India Anna Dravida Munnetra Kazhagam politicians
Year of birth missing (living people)
Place of birth missing (living people)